Madrasatul Islah is a traditional Islamic institution of learning and a renowned center of oriental and Islamic studies at Sarai Mir in the Azamgarh district of Uttar Pradesh. It was started by Mawlana Muhammad Shafi in 1908 along with participation of prominent scholars and religious seminaries of the area. The madrassa was established with a different syllabus and ideology than that of Darul Uloom Deoband and Darul Uloom Nadwatul Ulama.
Shibli Nomani and Hamiduddin Farahi are regarded as chief architects of this madrasa.

Inception
The foundation stone of the madrassa was laid by Asghar Hussain Deobandi in 1908.Hamiduddin Farahi was its first chief administrator.Amin Ahsan Islahi remained teaching in the madrassa until 1943.

Style
The Madrasa adopted a teaching style of reading the Qur'an text directly with less reliance on commentaries.  A newspaper article in 2009 indicated the madrasa has, in common with many others, introduced "modern, progressive syllabi".

Notable alumni
The madrassa has produced a number of notable Islamic scholars:
 Mohammad Najatuallah Siddiqi
 Abdul Azim Islahi
 Amin Ahsan Islahi 
 Wahiduddin Khan
 Ishtiyaq Ahmad Zilli
 Sadruddin Islahi

Legacy
 2003, Role of Madrasatul Islah Azamgarh in the development of Arabic studies, PhD thesis by Arshad Azmi, Aligarh Muslim University.

See also
 Darul Uloom Deoband

References

Bibliography 

 
 

Islamic universities and colleges in India
Universities and colleges in Uttar Pradesh
Azamgarh district
Educational institutions established in 1908
1908 establishments in India
Shibli Nomani